Tadamon Sports Social Club is a Syrian football club based in Latakia. It was founded in 1980. They play their home games at the Al-Assad Stadium.

References

Tadamon
Association football clubs established in 1980
1980 establishments in Syria
Sport in Latakia